Obrež may refer to:
 
Obrež (Varvarin), Serbia
Obrež (Pećinci), Serbia
Obrež, Slovenia

Obrez (from Russian: Обрез) may refer to:
 A modified firearm, with barrel and stock cut down in length, for example a sawn-off shotgun. As a loan-word in English, the term most commonly refers to a Mosin-Nagant modified in such a configuration.

fr:Obrež (Pećinci)
sr:Обреж (Пећинци)